Latvia participated in the Eurovision Song Contest 2005 with the song "The War Is Not Over" written by Mārtiņš Freimanis. The song was performed by Walters and Kazha. Songwriter Mārtiņš Freimanis represented Latvia in the Eurovision Song Contest 2003 as part of the group F.L.Y. with the song "Hello from Mars" where they placed twenty-fourth in the competition. The Latvian broadcaster Latvijas Televīzija (LTV) organised the national final Eirodziesma 2005 in order to select the Latvian entry for the 2005 contest in Kyiv, Ukraine. Twenty songs were selected to compete in the national final, which consisted of three shows: two semi-finals and a final. In the semi-finals on 29 January and 5 February 2005, five entries were selected to advance from each show: three entries selected based on a public televote and two entries selected by a jury panel. Ten songs ultimately qualified to compete in the final on 26 February 2005 where two rounds of public voting selected "The War Is Not Over" performed by Valters and Kaža as the winner.

Latvia competed in the semi-final of the Eurovision Song Contest which took place on 19 May 2005. Performing during the show in position 5, "The War Is Not Over" was announced among the top 10 entries of the semi-final and therefore qualified to compete in the final on 21 May. It was later revealed that Latvia placed tenth out of the 25 participating countries in the semi-final with 85 points. In the final, Latvia performed in position 23 and placed fifth out of the 24 participating countries, scoring 153 points.

Background 

Prior to the 2005 contest, Latvia had participated in the Eurovision Song Contest five times since its first entry in 2000. Latvia won the contest once in 2002 with the song "I Wanna" performed by Marie N. Following the introduction of semi-finals for the 2004, Latvia had failed to qualify to the final with the entry "Dziesma par laimi" performed by Fomins and Kleins. The Latvian national broadcaster, Latvijas Televīzija (LTV), which broadcasts the event within Latvia and organises the selection process for the nation's entry, confirmed their intentions to participate at the 2005 Eurovision Song Contest on 4 September 2004. Latvia has selected their entries for the Eurovision Song Contest through a national final. Since their debut in 2000, LTV had organised the selection show Eirodziesma. Along with their participation confirmation, the broadcaster announced that they would organise Eirodziesma 2005 in order to select the Latvian entry for the 2005 contest.

Before Eurovision

Eirodziesma 2005 
Eirodziesma 2005 was the sixth edition of Eirodziesma, the music competition that selects Latvia's entries for the Eurovision Song Contest. The competition commenced on 29 January 2005 and concluded with a final on 26 February 2005. All shows in the competition were hosted by Elvis Jansons and Ija Circene and broadcast on LTV1.

Format 
The format of the competition consisted of three shows: two semi-finals and a final. The two semi-finals, held on 29 January and 5 February 2005, each featured ten competing entries from which five advanced to the final from each show. The final, held on 26 February 2005, selected the Latvian entry for Kyiv from the remaining ten entries over two rounds of voting: the first round selected the top three songs and the second round (superfinal) selected the winner. Results during the semi-final shows were determined by a jury panel and votes from the public. The songs first faced a public vote where the top three entries qualified. The jury then selected an additional two qualifiers from the remaining entries to proceed in the competition. In the final, a public vote exclusively determined which entry would be the winner. Viewers were able to vote via telephone or SMS.

Competing entries 
Artists and songwriters were able to submit their entries to the broadcaster between 10 September 2004 and 16 November 2004. 64 entries were submitted at the conclusion of the submission period. A jury panel appointed by LTV evaluated the submitted songs and selected twenty entries for the competition. The jury panel consisted of Alar Kotkas (Estonian composer), Amberlife (Lithuanian musician and songwriter), Michael Cederberg (representative of Sveriges Radio P3), Ramona Forsström (Promotion Manager of International Repertoire at EMI Finland), Edward van de Vendel (Dutch poet and lyricist), Jānis Lūsēns (composer), members of the LTV Eurovision team and music directors at LTV. The twenty competing artists and songs were announced during a press conference on 2 December 2004. On 6 January 2005, LTV announced that the song "Your Love Is on My Side" would be performed by the duo Creem instead of Lily.

Shows

Semi-finals 
The two semi-finals took place on 29 January and 5 February 2005. The live portion of the show was held at the LTV Studio 1 in Riga where the artists awaited the results while their performances, which were filmed earlier on 23 January 2005, were screened. In each semi-final ten acts competed and five entries qualified to the final. The competing entries first faced a public vote where the top three songs advanced; an additional two qualifiers were then selected from the remaining seven entries by the jury.

Final 
The final took place at the Olympic Center in Ventspils on 26 February 2005. The ten entries that qualified from the preceding two semi-finals competed and the winner was selected over two rounds of public televoting. In the first round, the top three songs advanced to the second round, the superfinal. In the superfinal, "The War Is Not Over" performed by Valters and Kaža was declared the winner. In addition to the performances of the competing entries, guest performers included singers Amberlife and Ladybird, the group re:public, the band Symbolic with Niks Matvejevs, 2001 Latvian Eurovision entrant Arnis Mednis together with the group Odis, 2003 Latvian Eurovision entrant F.L.Y. and 2004 Latvian Eurovision entrant Fomins and Kleins.

At Eurovision
According to Eurovision rules, all nations with the exceptions of the host country, the "Big Four" (France, Germany, Spain and the United Kingdom), and the ten highest placed finishers in the 2004 contest are required to qualify from the semi-final on 19 May 2005 in order to compete for the final on 21 May 2005; the top ten countries from the semi-final progress to the final. On 22 March 2005, a special allocation draw was held which determined the running order for the semi-final and Latvia was set to perform in position 5, following the entry from Moldova and before the entry from Monaco. Latvian Sign Language was also used by Walters and Kazha for the performance, making it the first Eurovision entry to feature a sign language. At the end of the show, Latvia was announced as having finished in the top 10 and subsequently qualifying for the grand final. It was later revealed that Latvia placed tenth in the semi-final, receiving a total of 85 points. The draw for the running order for the final was done by the presenters during the announcement of the ten qualifying countries during the semi-final and Latvia was drawn to perform in position 23, following the entry from Switzerland and before the entry from France. Latvia placed fifth in the final, scoring 153 points.

The semi-final and the final were broadcast in Latvia on LTV1 with all shows featuring commentary by Kārlis Streips. The Latvian spokesperson, who announced the Latvian votes during the final, was Marie N.

Voting 
Below is a breakdown of points awarded to Latvia and awarded by Latvia in the semi-final and grand final of the contest. The nation awarded its 12 points to Estonia in the semi-final and to Switzerland in the final of the contest.

Points awarded to Latvia

Points awarded by Latvia

References

2005
Countries in the Eurovision Song Contest 2005
Eurovision